Obraztsovoye is a rural locality (a selo) in Ayryumovskoye Rural Settlement of Giaginsky District, Adygea, Russia. The population was 361 as of 2018. There are 3 streets.

Geography 
The village is located on the Ayrym River, 13 km east of Giaginskaya (the district's administrative centre) by road. Progress is the nearest rural locality.

References 

Rural localities in Giaginsky District